Nancy Irene Rouillard (married names: Ludington, Graham, born July 25, 1939) is an American former pair skater.

Personal life
Rouillard was born in Stoneham, Massachusetts. She has been married twice, once to pairs partner Ronald Ludington in 1957 and the second time to Frank Graham. She lives in Maine and featured on "Bill Green's Maine" on February 15, 2014.

Career
She began competing with Ronald Ludington in 1956 and she won her first national title under her maiden name. She changed her name professionally after she married Ludington in 1957. The Ludingtons went on to win the bronze medal at the 1960 Winter Olympics. They also won the U.S. national title between 1957 and 1960, after having been the junior national champions in 1956. They are also the 1959 World bronze medalists.

Results
(pairs with Ronald Ludington)

References

External links
 
 

1939 births
Living people
People from Stoneham, Massachusetts
Sportspeople from Middlesex County, Massachusetts
American female pair skaters
Figure skaters at the 1960 Winter Olympics
Olympic bronze medalists for the United States in figure skating
Olympic medalists in figure skating
World Figure Skating Championships medalists
Medalists at the 1960 Winter Olympics
21st-century American women
20th-century American women